Vexillum caliendrum is a species of small sea snail, marine gastropod mollusk in the family Costellariidae, the ribbed miters.

Description
The length of the shell attains 24.5 mm, its diameter 8 mm.

The solid, fusiform shell is brown and narrowly white-banded spirally. The shell consists of 10-12 whorls. It is furnished with many oblique ribs on the upper whorls, about eleven on the body whorl. The narrow aperture is squarely oblong, lilac within. The outer lip is thickened and crenulate. The recurved columella is four times plaited.

Distribution
This marine species occurs in the Persian Gulf and the Gulf of Oman.

References

External links
 

caliendrum
Gastropods described in 1901